Saurita cretheis is a moth in the subfamily Arctiinae. It was described by Herbert Druce in 1883. It is found in Ecuador.

Adults are black brown. The forewings have two slight hyaline (glass-like) streaks in the end of the cell and a narrow wedge-shaped streak below the cell and a series of patches between the bases of veins 2 to 7. The hindwings have a hyaline streak in and beyond the lower end of the cell and a short streak beyond the upper angle.

References

Moths described in 1883
Saurita